Eliana Navarro Barahona (19 June 1920 – 5 June 2006) was a Chilean poet. Her poetry was praised from an early date by literary critic Hernán Díaz Arrieta. Her poetry has been studied in various Chilean and foreign universities and her work appears in many national and foreign anthologies.

Early years and education 
Eliana Navarro was born in Valparaíso on June 19, 1920. Her parents were Fortunato Navarro Herrera, deputy for Cautín Province and vice-president of the Chamber of Deputies, and Guillermina Barahona Soriano, a teacher. In 1923, the family settled in Fundo El Peral, located in Trovolhue, province of Cautín, now Ninth region of Chile.

Inspired by the landscape of Cautín and influenced by the southern poet Augusto Winter, Navarro wrote, at the age of seven, "La laguna de Trovolhue", one of her earliest poems. At the age of 14, her works were published in the magazines Margarita and En Viaje. After studying humanities at the Santa Cruz de Temuco school, she moved to Santiago where she studied Philosophy and Law at the Catholic and Chilean universities.

Career
In 1951, Navarro published Tres poemas (Three Poems), her first book. Four years later, she joined the Grupo Fuego de la Poesía founded by José Miguel Vicuña and Carlos René Correa. Carlos René Correa . In 1955, through Grupo Fuego de la Poesía, she published Antiguas voces llaman. The journals "Calicanto" and the "Literary Magazine of the Society of Writers of Chile " reviewed her verses in this period. She was a delegate to the PEN Club Congress in Fráncfort in 1959. In 1963, she was a delegate of the Society of Writers of Chile (SECH) to the World Congress of Women for Peace in Moscow. In 1965, Navarro's book, La ciudad que fue, was published by Editorial Universitaria and was awarded the Pedro de Oña prize.

Navarro worked for more than 40 years in the Library of the National Congress of Chile being for many years head of the Cataloging section. In 1973 , with her family, she formed the theater group "Mediodía", which, under the direction of Teodoro Lowey premiered in the Votive Temple of Maipú before a crowded audience the poem with vocals for choir entitled La pasión según San Juan (The Passion According to San Juan). Published in 1980, she was awarded Eliana Navarro Prize by Academia Chilena de la Lengua. In 1981, she attended as a guest speaker the International Congress of Women's Literature in Mexico. In 1995, her book, La Flor de la Montaña, was published by Editorial Universitaria in the collection "El Polydro and El Mar". On more than one occasion, she was a candidate for the National Prize for Literature and jurist in multiple poetry contests, including the Fondo del Libro y la Lectura.

Some of her works remain unpublished. One of them is Profesión de silencio (Profession of silence), in which she tackles injustice and pain from the repression suffered during the 1973-90 military dictatorship of Chile.

Personal life
At 25, she married the poet José Miguel Vicuña, who was on the law faculty of the University of Chile. She was mother of seven children, Ariel Vicuña, poet and musician; Ana María Vicuña, philosopher and teacher of classical languages; Miguel Vicuña, poet and philosopher; Juan Vicuña, a chemist, and a victim of torture during the dictatorship; Leonora Vicuña, photographer; Rodrigo Vicuña, editor; and Pedro Vicuña, poet and actor. Navarro died June 5, 2006, in Santiago, at the age of 75, a victim of cerebral thrombosis.

Awards 
 Premio Pedro de Oña, 1965
 Premio de la Academia Chilena de la Lengua, 1980

Selected works 
 Tres poemas, 1951.
 Antiguas voces llaman, Santiago de Chile: Grupo Fuego, 1955. 
 La ciudad que fue, Santiago, Chile : Editorial Universitaria, 1965 
 La pasión según San Juan, Santiago de Chile: Ediciones de la Biblioteca del Congreso Nacional, 1981. 
 La Flor de la Montaña, Santiago de Chile Ed. Universitaria, 1995. ,  

Posthumously-published work
 Ángelus de Mediodía, Santiago de Chile : Editorial Universitaria, 2008. ,

References

Bibliography 
 Arteche, Miguel, Juan Antonio Massone y Roque Esteban Scarpa, Poesía Chilena Contemporánea, Editorial Andrés Bello, Santiago, 1997.
 Bussche, Gastón von dem, Estudios sobre la poesía de Eliana Navarro, Concepción 1964.
 Hahn, Óscar, La poesía también se llama Eliana Navarro, 2007.
 Lastra, Pedro, Relectura de Eliana Navarro, 2007.
 Matus Olivier, Alfredo , Y de allí, su claridad, 2007.
 
 Silva Acevedo, Manuel, Eliana Navarro, el gozo y el dolor de ser poeta, Santiago de Chile 2005.
 Szmulewicz, Efraín  Diccionario de la Literatura Chilena, Ediciones Rumbos, Santiago 1997.
 Valdés, Adriana Celebración de Eliana Navarro,  2006.

External links 
 Official website (in Spanish)
 Eliana Navarro at Archivo de Referencias Críticas

1920 births
2006 deaths
Chilean people of Basque descent
20th-century Chilean women writers
20th-century Chilean poets
Chilean women poets
People from Valparaíso